Cửu Long may refer to:

Mekong River or Cửu Long River, a major river in Southeast Asia
Mekong Delta or Cửu Long Delta, region in southwestern Vietnam where the Mekong River empties into the sea
Cửu Long Province, a former Vietnamese province in the Mekong Delta
4th Corps (Vietnam People's Army) or Cửu Long Corps, a regular army corps of the People's Army of Vietnam

See also
Operation Cuu Long 44-02, a 1971 operation by South Vietnamese and Cambodian forces to reopen Route 4 in Cambodia 
Jiulong (disambiguation), Mandarin equivalent
Kowloon (disambiguation), Cantonese equivalent